Goblesville is an unincorporated community in Clear Creek Township, Huntington County, Indiana.

History
Goblesville sprang up in the 19th century around a sawmill owned by John Goble, original Hoss of Goblesville. A post office called Goblesville was established in 1883, and remained in operation until it was discontinued in 1905.

Geography

References

Unincorporated communities in Huntington County, Indiana
Unincorporated communities in Indiana